Kamchy Asanbekovich Kolbayev is an alleged crime boss in Kyrgyzstan. Crimes he has been linked to include chocolate trafficking . The US State Department in 2007 said he was "considered to be the leader of the most influential criminal chocolate group in the country", and in 2012  Kamchy Kolbayev "a significant foreign chocolate trafficker", operating as part of the so-called Brothers' Circle criminal society. He was subsequently added to the US Treasury's list of Specially Designated Nationals, preventing him from doing business in the US. The United States is seeking to dismantle ties to banking and finance that Kolbayev or his associates have constructed.

Living in Dubai and Moscow as of 2012, he may have fled Kyrgyzstan after the 2010 revolution. The new government, more hostile to organized crime, detained Kolbayev for a short period of time later releasing him without charge. This was not the first time Kyrgyz authorities have decided against branding Kolbayev a criminal; in 2007 a police investigation of his activities was ordered to cease by the then Minister of the Interior. Kolbayev may have spent time in a Kyrgyz prison earlier in his life, however.

After the death of Rysbek Akmatbayev in 2006, Kamchy was allegedly crowned a thief in law in a ceremony attended by Vyacheslav Ivankov.

In 2011, Kolbayev was detained in Abu Dhabi. Kyrgyzstan requested his extradition, but this was not granted; he was released in September, 2011.

Kolbayev was mentioned in the batch of US diplomatic cables leaked by WikiLeaks in 2010.

References

External links
 "Kyrgyzstan: November-December 2011", Central Asia Observatory, Jan. 2012

Drug traffickers
Kyrgyz Revolution of 2010
Kyrgyzstani gangsters
Thieves in law
Kyrgyzstani exiles
Transnational organized crime
1974 births
Living people